Wilhelm Hedly Eliassen (13 August 1935 – 3 March 2021) was a Norwegian footballer. He played in one match for the Norway national football team in 1960.

References

External links
 
 

1935 births
2021 deaths
Norwegian footballers
Norway international footballers
People from Mo i Rana
Association football forwards
Frigg Oslo FK players